The Machakos Institute of Technology''' (MIT) is a private institute in Machakos, Eastern Province, Kenya. MIT has nine schools with an emphasis on social work, community development, and scientific and technological research.

MIT was founded in 2008 in response to the expansion in primary and secondary education in Kenya and a lack of corresponding increase in mid-level training colleges and universities. This led to the inability of majority of KCSE school leavers to access training, leading to a huge training gap.

The institute offers short, certificate, diploma and advanced diploma courses, and runs consultancy services.

Academics

Schools
MIT is divided into nine schools:
 School of Social Work and Community Development
 School of Counseling and Psychology
 School of Applied and Health Sciences
 School of Business Education
 School of Computing and Information Technology
 School of Hairdressing and Beauty Therapy
 School of Accounts and Finance
 School of Hospitality Management
 School of Engineering

Qualifications for admission
The minimum qualification for entry to a Diploma course is grade KCSE C- or KCE Div. 2 or its equivalent or KCE Div. 3 or the equivalent. Those with bridging courses are considered on individual basis.

Intake
The three MIT intakes are in January, May and September. Registration for the distance learning programme is possible throughout the year. Students can register online.

Mode of study
Methods of study are:
 Full-time (day time): 8.00 am - 6.00 pm, Mon – Fri
 Evening classes: 5.30 pm - 7.30 pm, Mon – Fri
 Saturday classes: 8.00 am - 4.00 pm
 Blocks: April, August and December
 Distant learning programme (learning by correspondence)

Examinations
Examinations are administered by several examination bodies:
 Kenya National Examination Council (KNEC) 
 Association of Business Managers and Administrators (ABMA -UK)
 Association of Business Executives]] (ABE)
 Kenya Accountancy and Secretarial National Examination Board (KASNEB)
 Institute of Commercial Management(ICM)
  CDAAC
  NITA 
The programmes evaluation and quality assurance is done by Ministry of Education, Science and Technology (Kenya)|Ministry of Education, Science and Technology, Commission for University Education, and institutions collaborating with MIT.

Short courses
Short courses are organized at the beginning of each year. The institute links up with the Kenya Institute of Social Work to offer the training programmes.

Consultancy
The objective of the consultancy services is to provide advice in particular areas of expertise.

Student activities

Clubs
  Young Christian Students
  Christian Union
  Debate Club
  Drama|Drama Club
  Environmental Club
  Social Workers Club
  Career Club

Sports
  Soccer
  Netball
  Volleyball
  Rugby
  Athletics (track and field)
  Basketball 
  Table tennis
  Taekwondo 
  Karate 
  Boxing 
  Swimming 
  Badminton 
  Baseball

References

External links
 Machakos Institute of Technology MIT website
 Kenya Ministry of Education Education website
 Kenya National Examination Council Education website

Technical universities and colleges
Universities and colleges in Kenya
Education in Eastern Province (Kenya)
Education in Kenya
Educational institutions established in 2008
2008 establishments in Kenya